Events from the year 1683 in Sweden

Incumbents
 Monarch – Charles XI

Events

   by Maria Simointytär, first published poem by a female in the province of Finland

Births

 25 February - Jakob Benzelius, Archbishop of Uppsala in the Church of Sweden (died 1747) 
 October - Charlotta von Liewen, politically active countess (died 1735)
 Date unknown - Ulrika Eleonora Stålhammar, famous cross dressing soldier (died 1733)
 Date unknown - Anna Maria Thelott, engraver and woodcut-artist (died 1710)

Deaths

 16 November - Margareta Huitfeldt, landowner and donor  (born 1608) 
 Bengt Skytte, courtier and diplomat (born 1614) 
 Birgitta Durell, industrialist  (born 1619)

References

 
Years of the 17th century in Sweden
Sweden